Mākaha Beach Park is a white sand beach in Mākaha, Hawaii, the neighbor of the beaches southeast of Ka‘ena Point such as Yokohama Bay (Keawa‘ula Beach) and Mākua Beach.

Beaches of Oahu
Parks in Hawaii

References